Kjell Voll (born 12 March 1966) is a Norwegian rower. He competed in the men's double sculls event at the 1988 Summer Olympics.

References

External links
 

1966 births
Living people
Norwegian male rowers
Olympic rowers of Norway
Rowers at the 1988 Summer Olympics
Sportspeople from Stavanger